The Battle of Rabaul, also known by the Japanese as Operation R, an instigating action of the New Guinea campaign, was fought on the island of New Britain in the Australian Territory of New Guinea, from 23 January into February 1942. It was a strategically significant defeat of Allied forces by Japan in the Pacific campaign of World War II, with the Japanese invasion force quickly overwhelming the small Australian garrison, the majority of which was either killed or captured. Hostilities on the neighbouring island of New Ireland are usually considered to be part of the same battle. Rabaul was significant because of its proximity to the Japanese territory of the Caroline Islands, site of a major Imperial Japanese Navy base on Truk.

Following the capture of the port of Rabaul, Japanese forces turned it into a major base and proceeded to land on mainland New Guinea, advancing toward Port Moresby. Heavy fighting followed along the Kokoda Track, and around Milne Bay, before the Japanese were eventually pushed back towards Buna–Gona by early 1943. As part of Operation Cartwheel, throughout 1943–1945, Allied forces later sought to isolate the Japanese garrison on Rabaul, rather than capturing it, largely using air power to do so, with US and Australian ground forces pursuing a limited campaign in western New Britain during this time.

By the end of the war, there was still a sizeable garrison at Rabaul, with large quantities of equipment that were subsequently abandoned. In the aftermath, it took the Allies over two years to repatriate the captured Japanese soldiers, while clean up efforts continued past the late 1950s. Many relics including ships, aircraft and weapons, as well as abandoned positions and tunnels, remain in the area.

Prelude

Rabaul lies on the eastern end of the island of New Britain. At the time of the battle, the town was the capital of the Australian-administered Territory of New Guinea, having been captured from the Germans in 1914. In March 1941, the Australians dispatched a small garrison to the region, as tensions with Japan heightened. The small Australian Army garrison in New Britain was built around Lieutenant Colonel Howard Carr's 700-strong 2/22nd Battalion, an Australian Imperial Force (AIF) infantry battalion. This battalion formed part of Lark Force, which eventually numbered 1,400 men and was commanded by Lieutenant Colonel John Scanlan. The force also included personnel from a local Militia unit, the New Guinea Volunteer Rifles (NGVR), a coastal defence battery, an anti-aircraft battery, an anti-tank battery and a detachment of the 2/10th Field Ambulance. The 2/22nd Battalion Band—which was also included in Lark Force—is perhaps the only military unit ever to have been entirely recruited from the ranks of the Salvation Army. A commando unit, the 130-strong 2/1st Independent Company, was detached to garrison the nearby island of New Ireland.

Throughout 1941, the Allies had planned to build Rabaul up as a "secure fleet anchorage" with plans to establish a radar station and a strong defensive minefield; however, these plans were ultimately shelved. Allied planners later determined that they did not have the capacity to expand the garrison around Rabaul, nor was the naval situation conducive to reinforcing it should the garrison come under attack. Nevertheless, the decision was made that the garrison would remain in place  to hold Rabaul as a forward observation post. The main tasks of the garrison were protection of Vunakanau, the main Royal Australian Air Force (RAAF) airfield near Rabaul, and the nearby flying boat anchorage in Simpson Harbour, which were important for the surveillance of Japanese movements in the region. However, the RAAF contingent, under Wing Commander John Lerew, had little offensive capability, with only 10 lightly armed CAC Wirraway training aircraft and four Lockheed Hudson light bombers from No. 24 Squadron.

For the Japanese, Rabaul was important because of its proximity to the Caroline Islands, which was the site of a major Imperial Japanese Navy base on Truk. The capture of New Britain offered them a deep water harbour and airfields to provide protection to Truk and also to interdict Allied lines of communication between the United States and Australia. Following the capture of Guam, the South Seas Detachment, under Major General Tomitaro Horii, was tasked with capturing Kavieng and Rabaul, as part of "Operation R".

Japanese planning began with aerial reconnaissance of the town, which sought to identify the dispositions of the defending troops. Planners, who had been flown from Guam to Truk, determined three possible schemes of manoeuvre based on these dispositions: a landing near Kokop, aimed at establishing a beachhead; a landing on the north coast of Rabaul, followed by a drive on Rabaul from behind the main defences; or a multi-pronged landing focused on capturing the airfields and centre of the town. They eventually settled upon the third option. For the invasion, the Japanese established a brigade group based on the 55th Division. Its main combat units were the 144th Infantry Regiment, which consisted of a headquarters unit, three infantry battalions, an artillery company, signals unit, and a munitions squad, as well as a few platoons from the 55th Cavalry Regiment, a battalion from the 55th Mountain Artillery Regiment and a company from the 55th Engineer Regiment. These forces would be supported by a large naval task force, and landing operations would be preceded by a heavy aerial campaign aimed at destroying Allied air assets in region, so that they could not interfere with the landing operations.

Battle
Most civilian men were forced to stay in Rabaul but women who were not necessary to the defence of the base were evacuated in December 1941, shortly before Japanese air raids began. Starting on 4 January 1942, Rabaul came under attack by large numbers of Japanese carrier-based aircraft. After the odds facing the Australians mounted significantly, the RAAF commander, Lerew, signalled RAAF HQ in Melbourne with the Latin phrase "Nos Morituri Te Salutamus" ("we who are about to die salute you"), supposedly uttered by gladiators in ancient Rome before entering combat. On 20 January, over 100 Japanese aircraft attacked Rabaul in multiple waves. Eight Wirraways attacked and in the ensuing fighting three RAAF planes were shot down, two crash-landed, and another was damaged. Six Australian aircrew were killed in action and five wounded. One of the attacking Japanese bombers was shot down by anti-aircraft fire. As a result of the intense air attacks, Australian coastal artillery was destroyed and Australian infantry were withdrawn from Rabaul itself. The following day, an RAAF Catalina flying boat crew located the invasion fleet off Kavieng, and its crew managed to send a signal before being shot down.

As the Australian ground troops took up positions along the western shore of Blanche Bay where they prepared to meet the landing, the remaining RAAF elements, consisting of two Wirraways and one Hudson, were withdrawn to Lae. Once the aircraft had departed with a number of wounded, the Australians destroyed the airfield. The bombing continued around Rabaul on 22 January and early that morning a Japanese force of between 3,000 and 4,000 troops landed just off New Ireland and waded ashore in deep water filled with dangerous mudpools. The 2/1st Independent Company had been dispersed around the island and the Japanese took the main town of Kavieng without opposition; after a sharp fight around the airfield the commandos fell back towards the Sook River. That night, the invasion fleet approached Rabaul and before dawn on 23 January, the South Seas Force entered Simpson Harbour and a force of around 5,000 troops, mainly from the 144th Infantry Regiment, commanded by Colonel Masao Kusunose, began to land on New Britain.

A series of desperate actions followed near the beaches around Simpson Harbour, Keravia Bay and Raluana Point as the Australians attempted to turn back the attack. The 3rd Battalion, 144th Infantry Regiment, under the command of Lieutenant Colonel Kuwada Ishiro, was held up at Vulcan Beach by a mixed company of Australians from the 2/22nd and the NGVR, but elsewhere the other two battalions of the South Seas Force were able to land at unguarded locations and began moving inland. Within hours, Lakunai airfield had been captured by the Japanese force. Assessing the situation as hopeless, Scanlan ordered "every man for himself", and Australian soldiers and civilians split into small groups, up to company size, and retreated through the jungle, moving along the north and south coasts. During the fighting on 23 January, the Australians lost two officers and 26 other ranks killed in action.

Only the RAAF had made evacuation plans. Although initially ordered to turn his ground staff into infantrymen in a last-ditch effort to defend the island, Lerew insisted that they be evacuated and organised for them to be flown out by flying boat and his one remaining Hudson. In the days that followed the capture of Rabaul, the Japanese began mopping up operations, starting on 24 January. Australian soldiers remained at large in the interior of New Britain for many weeks, but Lark Force had made no preparations for guerrilla warfare on New Britain. Without supplies, their health and military effectiveness declined. Leaflets posted by Japanese patrols or dropped from planes stated in English, "you can find neither food nor way of escape in this island and you will only die of hunger unless you surrender". The Japanese commander, Horii, tasked the 3rd Battalion, 144th Infantry Regiment with searching the southern part of the Gazelle Peninsula and securing the remaining Australians. Over 1,000 Australian soldiers were captured or surrendered during the following weeks after the Japanese landed a force at Gasmata, on New Britain's south coast, on 9 February, severing the Australians' line of retreat. Following this, the Japanese reorganised their forces, occupying a line along the Keravat River, to prevent possible counterattacks.

Aftermath

Casualties
From mainland New Guinea, some civilians and individual officers from the Australian New Guinea Administrative Unit organised unofficial rescue missions to New Britain, and between March and May about 450 troops and civilians were evacuated by sea. Notwithstanding these efforts, Allied losses, particularly in relation to personnel captured, were very high and casualties during the fighting for Rabaul in early 1942 were heavily in favour of the Japanese. The Allies lost six aircrew killed and five wounded, along with 28 soldiers killed in action, and over 1,000 captured. Against this, the Japanese lost only 16 killed and 49 wounded.

Of the over 1,000 Australian soldiers taken prisoner, around 160 were massacred on or about 4 February 1942 in four separate incidents around Tol and Waitavalo. Six men survived these killings and later described what had happened to a Court of Inquiry. The Australian government concluded the prisoners were marched into the jungle near Tol Plantation in small groups and were then bayoneted by Japanese soldiers. At the nearby Waitavalo Plantation, another group of Australian prisoners were shot. The Allies later placed responsibility for the incident on Masao Kusunose, the commanding officer of the 144th Infantry Regiment, but in late 1946 he starved himself to death before he could stand trial. At least 800 soldiers and 200 civilian prisoners of war—most of them Australian—lost their lives on 1 July 1942, when the ship on which they were being transported from Rabaul to Japan, the Montevideo Maru, was sunk off the north coast of Luzon by the U.S. submarine .

Subsequent operations
According to Japanese author Kengoro Tanaka, the operation to capture Rabaul was the only operation of the New Guinea campaign that was completely successful for the Japanese. Following the capture of Rabaul, the Japanese quickly repaired the damage to Rabaul's airfield and Rabaul became the biggest Japanese base in New Guinea, and the lynchpin to their defences in the region. The Australians tried to restrict Rabaul's development soon after its capture by a bombing counter-attack in March. The Japanese eventually extended their control across New Britain, establishing airfields at Cape Gloucester on the island's western tip and several small outposts along the coast to provide stop-over points for small boats travelling between Rabaul and New Guinea. Meanwhile, a handful of Lark Force members remained at large on New Britain and New Ireland and, in conjunction with the local islanders, conducted guerrilla operations against the Japanese, serving mainly as coast watchers, providing information of Japanese shipping movements.

For the Japanese, the capture of Rabaul was followed with further operations on mainland New Guinea, beginning with operations to capture the Salamaua–Lae region beginning in March 1942. Throughout 1942 and into early 1943, the Allies and Japanese fought along the Kokoda Track, at Milne Bay and around Buna–Gona as the Japanese sought to advance south towards Port Moresby. By mid-1943, the tide turned in favour of the Allies, who began an offensive in the Pacific, aimed at advancing north through New Guinea and the Solomon Islands. According to author Eric Larrabee, "thereafter no Japanese heavy ships ever came to Rabaul."

Allied planners had considered capturing Rabaul, but they eventually settled on isolating it and bypassing it  as part of Operation Cartwheel. In December 1943, U.S. Marines and Army soldiers landed in western New Britain at Arawe and Cape Gloucester. Subsequently, Allied operations on New Britain gradually restricted the Japanese force to the area around Rabaul. In November 1944, the Australians returned to the island when advanced elements of the 5th Division landed at Jacquinot Bay on the south coast, and relieved the US 40th Infantry Division. The Australians then conducted a number of other landings around the island as they conducted a limited advance north, securing a line across the base of the Gazelle Peninsula between Wide Bay and Open Bay. After this, they sought to isolate and contain the main Japanese forces around Rabaul. When Japan surrendered in August 1945, there were still around 69,000 Japanese troops in Rabaul.

Large quantities of equipment were subsequently abandoned around Rabaul after the war, and it took over two years for the Allies to repatriate the Japanese garrison that was captured after Japan surrendered. In the late 1950s, Japanese salvage companies began work to salvage many of the ship wrecks around Rabaul. However, many abandoned positions, tunnels, and equipment relics such as aircraft and weapons can still be found in the area.

See also
 Shigeru Mizuki (lost his left arm in this battle)

Notes

References

External links

Conflicts in 1942
1942 in Papua New Guinea
South West Pacific theatre of World War II
Battles of World War II involving Australia
Battles of World War II involving Japan
Battles and operations of World War II involving Papua New Guinea
Amphibious operations of World War II
January 1942 events
February 1942 events